Matthew Stewart, Earl of Lennox may refer to:

Matthew Stewart, 2nd Earl of Lennox (1488–1513), Scottish nobleman
Matthew Stewart, 4th Earl of Lennox (1516–1571), father of Henry Stewart, King of the Scots